A Deputy Chairman of the Government of the Russian Federation is a member of the Government of Russia. The post is commonly referred to as "deputy prime minister" both in and outside of Russia. According to the Chapter 6, Article 110 of the Constitution of Russia, "The Government of the Russian Federation consists of the chairman of the Government of the Russian Federation, Deputy Chairman of the Government of the Russian Federation and federal ministries". Article 112 states that the Chairman of the Government (Prime Minister) recommends candidates for the post of deputy chairmen to the President of Russia. The role of deputy chairmen of government of the Russian Federation is to coordinate the activities of federal government bodies and carry out other tasks in response to particular issues or events. The most senior of them is the First Deputy Prime Minister of Russia.

Current deputy prime ministers

Complete list of deputy prime ministers
The following is a list of all individuals who have held the office of Deputy Chairman of Government in the Russian Federation since 1991, as well as the cabinets that they were part of.

See also
First Deputy Prime Minister of Russia

Notes

References

Russian Federation
Government of Russia